Ponte do Arco de Baúlhe, is a bridge in Portugal. It is located in Arco de Baúlhe, crossing the Tâmega River. The bridge connects the towns of Arco de Baúlhe and Pedraça.

See also
List of bridges in Portugal

Arco de Baúlhe
Cabeceiras de Basto